Beachwood Place is a shopping mall located in Beachwood, Ohio, an affluent Greater Cleveland suburb roughly  from downtown Cleveland. It is accessible from I-271 and close to I-480.

It is anchored by Dillard's, Nordstrom, and Saks Fifth Avenue. Luxury boutiques within Saks Fifth Avenue include Dior, Gucci, Louis Vuitton, and Prada. Other notable retailers include Zara, Kate Spade New York, MAC Cosmetics, Coach, and Tommy Bahama.

History
Beachwood Place was developed by The Rouse Company. The developer invested over a decade of time in studies and planning to create an upscale fashion center for wealthy people in Cleveland. Beachwood Place opened in August 1978. When it first opened, it was anchored by Higbee's and Saks Fifth Avenue and included 110 specialty shops. It was Saks' first Ohio store. Beachwood Place was unique in its award-winning design, with winding staircases. The mall found success as area shoppers slowly abandoned nearby malls such as Randall Park Mall and Severance Town Center as well as retail outlets in downtown Cleveland.

In 1992, Higbee's was converted into Dillard's and the developer began work on an addition to the mall. However, nearby residents took the developer to court to halt expansion. Their efforts were unsuccessful and the expansion was completed, after over two years, with a grand reopening on September 18, 1997. The food court was not changed, despite original renovation plans that intended to remove the food court and spread restaurants throughout the mall. The expansion added Nordstrom, which anchored the new, 40 store wing. In addition to Nordstrom, an Eddie Bauer flagship store opened at the main entrance, Dillard's added a third floor, and Saks also expanded.

In 2004, The Rouse Company was acquired by General Growth Properties. The new owners immediately began a remodeling that was completed in time for the 2007 Christmas season. Landscaping and natural light was used to soften the entry and kinetic art was installed to create a greater visual dynamic. The food court was relocated to the second floor; with the new area being defined by natural light and more seating. Swedish department store H&M joined Beachwood Place.

In 2013, a Microsoft Store, Kate Spade New York, and See's Candies opened in the mall.

Zara opened on November 2, 2016.

Planned expansion
In January 2013, the owner announced plans to expand the mall; citing four lost leasing opportunities due to its 96% occupancy rate. There are 11 residential parcels on the western edge of the mall which can be rezoned. Plans were released in July 2013 showing a  expansion including three standalone restaurants added along the perimeter. Nearby residents and local businessmen voiced concern about increased traffic and a loss of a barrier between the mall and the surrounding residences. During the summer months, the owner sought signatures from residents to allow plans of its expansion to be put on a city referendum. In October 2013, the Beachwood City Council voted to amend the City's codified ordinances, allowing the expansion to proceed.

Recent developments
On November 4, 2022, the Beachwood police opened a field office on the second floor of the mall across from the food court. Two officers will be stationed there in order to enhance community relations between the police and the public.

References

External links
Beachwood Place

Beachwood, Ohio
Shopping malls in Cuyahoga County, Ohio
Brookfield Properties
Shopping malls established in 1978